Bill Gnaden (11 July 1932 – 12 November 1995) was an Australian rules footballer who played with Essendon in the Victorian Football League (VFL). Gnaden later played for Redan and was secretary of the Essendon Past Players Association.

Notes

External links 
		

Essendon Football Club past player profile

1932 births
1995 deaths
Australian rules footballers from Victoria (Australia)
Essendon Football Club players
Donnybrook Football Club players
Redan Football Club players